Prior to 2013, the Forestry Commission (now Forestry England) managed about one million hectares of land across Great Britain, including 660,000 hectares of forest in Scotland, 250,000 hectares in England and 126,000 hectares in Wales. In 2013 the Commission's forests in Wales were transferred to Natural Resources Wales, whilst Forestry and Land Scotland was established in Scotland in 2019 to own and manage Scotland's National Forest Estate.

These forests range from small scale urban forests to many of the largest forests in Britain. The Forestry Commission was set up in 1919 to carry out afforestation programmes across Britain for timber production. It is also responsible for maintaining and developing recreational facilities within the forests in England.

Forests in England

Forests in Scotland

Forests in Wales

References

See also
Forestry Commission
List of Forestry Commission land on the Isle of Wight

Forestry in the United Kingdom
Forestry Commission